is a former Japanese football player.

Club statistics

References

External links
j-league

1976 births
Living people
Rissho University alumni
Association football people from Iwate Prefecture
Japanese footballers
J2 League players
Mito HollyHock players
Iwate Grulla Morioka players
Association football midfielders